Dr. Rodulfo Figueroa is a locality in the Mexican state of Chiapas.

References

External links 
 Dr. Rodulfo Figueroa official website

Populated places in Chiapas